The FOM University of Applied Sciences for Economics and Management is Germany's largest private university. The business school is privately run, works in close co-operation with other universities, and is state recognized. With more than 42,000 students the FOM is the largest private university in Germany. Also it has the biggest economic and business sciences faculty in Germany.

The majority of students are working professionals. The range of courses offered centers on business, business administration, economic psychology and engineering. The FOM, founded in 1993, has traditionally close relationships with many major German companies.

History 
The university was founded in Essen in 1990 in order to cater to working people. On 18 September 1993 it received state recognition and in September 1994 it began operating. In the first year, there were 149 students studying Master of Business Administration. In 1998 they began to expand to other sites outside Essen. In 2005 they began offering courses in engineering in association with the Ruhr University Bochum.

In 2012, the university sued a former student for being too fast when completing 11 semesters worth of studies in only 4 semesters.

The FOM is accredited by the FIBAA since 2006 as well as the German Council of Science and Humanities since 2004.

Locations 
The main faculty is located in Essen. There are 35 other schools in Germany, located in Aachen, Arnsberg, Augsburg, Berlin, Bochum, Bonn, Bremen, Dortmund, Duisburg, Düsseldorf, Frankfurt am Main, Freiburg, Gütersloh, Hagen, Hamburg, Hannover, Herne, Karlsruhe, Kassel, Koblenz, Köln, Leipzig, Mainz, Mannheim, Marl, München, Münster, Neuss, Nürnberg, Oberhausen, Saarbrücken, Siegen, Stuttgart, Wesel and Wuppertal. There is also an FOM in Viena and in Luxembourg.

China 
Since 2003 FOM has had two faculties in China, one near Beijing and the other in the Shandong province in co-operation with the Shanghai University of Finance and Economics.

Industry partners 
The FOM has partnerships with more than 700 companies including 3M, Allianz, Deutsche Bank, RWE, Siemens, Deutsche Bahn, Bayer, HSBC Trinkaus, ThyssenKrupp, BMW, Vodafone, Ford, Deloitte and Ernst & Young.

Scientific facilities and  research institutes 
The university maintains a total of 11 research institutes and 15 "competence centers":
dips Deutsches Institut für Portfolio-Strategien
Research emphasis on financial portfolio management, quantitative modeling and asset management.
iap Institut für Arbeit und Personal
Research emphasis on organization and employee relations, with an emphasis on the organization of worktime.
ild Institut für Logistik und Dienstleistungsmanagement
Research emphasis on logistics, service management, and operation research.
ipo Institut für Personal- und Organisationforschung
Research emphasis on employee and organizational theory, with emphasis on incentive systems and knowledge management.
ild Institut für Logistik und Dienstleistungsmanagement
iaim Institute of Automation & Industrial Management
ifes Institut für Empirie & Statistik
ifgs Institut für Gesundheit & Soziales
ifid Institut für IT-Management & Digitalisierung
ifpm Institut für Public Management
isf Institute for Strategic Finance
iwp Institut für Wirtschaftspsychologie
mis Institute of Management & Information Systems
KCAT KompetenzCentrum für Accounting & Taxation
KCBT German-Sino Competence Center of Business & Technology
KCC KompetenzCentrum für Corporate Social Responsibility
KCD KompetenzCentrum für Didaktik in der Hochschullehre für Berufstätige
KCE KompetenzCentrum für Entrepreneurship & Mittelstand
KCFM KompetenzCentrum für Future Mobility
KCI KompetenzCentrum für interdisziplinäre Wirtschaftsforschung & Verhaltensoekonomie
KCM KompetenzCentrum für Medizinoekonomie
KCMS KompetenzCentrum für Marketing & Sales Management
KCN KompetenzCentrum für nachhaltige Entwicklung
KCQF KompetenzCentrum für Qualitative Forschung (Scientific directors: Prof. Dr. Ulrike Schwegler & Prof. Dr. Gernot Schiefer)
KCT KompetenzCentrum für Technologie- & Innovationsmanagement
KCU KompetenzCentrum für Unternehmensführung & Corporate Governance
KCV KompetenzCentrum für angewandte Volkswirtschaftslehre (Scientific directors: Prof. Dr. Christina Wilke & Prof. Dr. Monika Wohlmann)
KCW KompetenzCentrum für Wirtschaftsrecht

The FOM is member of the Stifterverband für die Deutsche Wissenschaft.

References

External links 
FOM Hochschule für Oekonomie & Management 

 
Business schools in Germany
Private universities and colleges in Germany
Universities of Applied Sciences in Germany
1990 establishments in Germany
Educational institutions established in 1990
Universities and colleges in Munich